†Holopeidae is an extinct family of paleozoic gastropod mollusks.  These molluscs were stationary epifaunal suspension feeders.

This family is unassigned to superfamily. This family has no subfamilies.

Genera
Genera in the family Holopeidae include:
 Cyclora
 Eopagodea
 Holopea J. Hall, 1847
 Pachystrophia Perner, 1903
 Ptychonema Perner, 1903
 Raphistomina Ulrich & Scofield, 1897
 Sinutropis Perner, 1903 but in family Euomphalidae
 Umbospira Perner, 1903

References

External links

 
Paleozoic